W.A.K.O. World Championships 2007 may refer to:

 W.A.K.O. World Championships 2007 (Belgrade)
 W.A.K.O. World Championships 2007 (Coimbra)